The Andul Rajbari is a palace or rajbari near Kolkata in Andul, Howrah district, West Bengal, India. The rajbari is now a heritage site of Andul.

Geography
Andul (Bengali: আন্দুল; IAST: Āndula) is a census town in the Sankrail block under the Sadar sub-division in Howrah district in the Indian state of West Bengal. It is a local hub of commercial and industrial activity within and around Sankrail block. It is considered as one of the developing towns in the district and located near to Kolkata city.

History

Raja Rajnarayan Bahadur built the palace in 1834 and it was made by the Granville Macleod Company. The family now owns a cinema hall and a local market as well.

Andul Raj picture gallery

References

Palaces in West Bengal
Buildings and structures in Howrah district
Neoclassical architecture in India
Tourist attractions in Howrah district